First Methodist Episcopal Church of Perry, now known as Perry United Methodist Church, is a historic Methodist Episcopal church at Perry in Wyoming County, New York, United States.  The Gothic Revival-style church is home to a Methodist congregation dating to 1816.  The sanctuary design is in the Akron Plan.

It was listed on the National Register of Historic Places in 2006.

References

External links
First Methodist Episcopal Church of Perry, New York - U.S. National Register of Historic Places on Waymarking.com

Churches on the National Register of Historic Places in New York (state)
Methodist churches in New York (state)
Gothic Revival church buildings in New York (state)
Churches in Wyoming County, New York
Akron Plan church buildings
National Register of Historic Places in Wyoming County, New York